Črni Potok pri Kočevju is a settlement southeast of the town of Kočevje in southern Slovenia. The area is part of the traditional region of Lower Carniola and is now included in the Southeast Slovenia Statistical Region.

Name
The name of the settlement was changed from Črni Potok to Črni Potok pri Kočevju in 1953. In the past the German name was Schwarzenbach.

History
The Črni Potok volunteer fire department became a founding unit of the Kočevje municipal fire department on 28 August 1955.

Church
The local church is dedicated to the Magi and belongs to the Parish of Kočevje. Fragments of late 15th-century frescos are preserved on its interior walls. Its main altar dates to the early 17th century.

References

External links
Črni Potok pri Kočevju on Geopedia
Pre–World War II map of Črni Potok pri Kočevju with oeconyms and family names

Populated places in the Municipality of Kočevje